Code page 1042 (CCSID 1042), also known as Simplified Chinese PC Data Extended, is a single byte character set (SBCS) used by IBM in its PC DOS operating system in China.
This code page is intended for use with code page 928 (Simplified Chinese double byte character set). It is an extension of Code page 903.

Code points 0x01 through 0x1F and x7F represent either graphic or control characters depending on the context.

Code points 0x81 through 0xFC are used as lead bytes for double byte characters.

Codepage layout

References

1042